This article lists events that occurred during 2004 in Estonia.

Incumbents
President – Arnold Rüütel
Prime Minister – Juhan Parts

Events
27 March – Estonia joined with NATO.
1 May – Estonia joined with European Union (accession of Estonia to the European Union).

Births

Deaths
24 April – Lia Laats, actress (b. 1926)

See also
 2004 in Estonian football
 2004 in Estonian television

References

 
2000s in Estonia
Estonia
Estonia
Years of the 21st century in Estonia